Gabriele Corbo (born 11 January 2000) is an Italian professional footballer who plays as a defender for  club Bologna.

Club career
Corbo made his Serie B debut for Spezia against Avellino on 11 May 2018.

Corbo signed for Bologna from Spezia in the summer of 2018 in a reported €2.2 million deal.

On 19 September 2020 he went to Ascoli on loan.

On 5 December 2021, it was announced Corbo would join MLS side CF Montréal on loan for their 2022 season.

International career
Corbo has represented Italy at U17, U18 and U20 level.

Personal life
Corbo is a native of Naples.

References

2000 births
Footballers from Naples
Living people
Italian footballers
Italy youth international footballers
Association football defenders
Ascoli Calcio 1898 F.C. players
Bologna F.C. 1909 players
Spezia Calcio players
CF Montréal players
Serie A players
Serie B players
Mediterranean Games silver medalists for Italy
Mediterranean Games medalists in football
Competitors at the 2018 Mediterranean Games
Major League Soccer players